The Saskatchewan Rush are a lacrosse team based in Saskatoon, Saskatchewan playing in the National Lacrosse League (NLL). The 2016 season is the 11th in franchise history but first in Saskatchewan after playing 10 seasons in Edmonton as the Edmonton Rush. The Rush won the NLL championship in 2015 before relocating.

Current standings

Game log

Regular season
Reference:

Playoffs

Player stats

Runners (Top 10)

Note: GP = Games played; G = Goals; A = Assists; Pts = Points; LB = Loose balls; PIM = Penalty minutes

Goaltenders
Note: GP = Games played; MIN = Minutes; W = Wins; L = Losses; GA = Goals against; Sv% = Save percentage; GAA = Goals against average

Transactions

Trades

Entry Draft
The 2015 NLL Entry Draft took place on September 28, 2015. The Rush made the following selections:

Roster

See also
2016 NLL season

References

Saskatchewan Rush
Saskatchewan Rush seasons
Saskatchewan Rush